Gladys Afamado (born 24 May 1925) is a Uruguayan visual artist, engraver, and poet. A member of the Montevideo Engraving Club since 1954, she has contributed to many of its monthly editions and almanacs. She later ventured into different plastic artforms, and in recent years has been recognized for her work in digital art.

Biography
Gladys Afamado was the second of five children of Isaac Isidoro Afamado, a Jewish immigrant based in Montevideo, and his wife Julia, the daughter of Italian immigrants, born in Dolores, Soriano. She attended public school, and in her home she received an open and free education, in which art, letters, and music were encouraged. His sister Ethel Afamado has had a distinguished career in music and poetry.

She received artistic training with Adolfo Pastor and Domingo Bazzurro at the Círculo de Bellas Artes and at the National School of Fine Arts between 1940 and 1950. Later she took ceramics courses with Duncan Quintela and screen printing with Rimer Cardillo. She studied semiotics with Jorge Medina Vidal and literature with Jorge Arbeleche.

From 1945 to 1950 she studied violin with Beatriz Tusset, and in 1951 and 1952 she participated in the "Anfión" chamber orchestra directed by Tusset.

The 1974 almanac of the Montevideo Engraving Club, titled Canción con todos, with Gladys Afamado's cover, was censored and removed from circulation by the de facto government.

In 1984, she traveled to Spain on a competitive scholarship, where she attended a paper craft course in Capellades, with Laurence Barker and Frederic Amat, material that she would later use in her works.

In 1986, she took a postgraduate course in metal engraving at the National Museum of Visual Arts, taught by David Finkbeiner of the State University of New York at Purchase.

Afamado's work is known for female figures with large eyes that look directly at the viewer, characteristic of the stage of the editions of the Montevideo Engraving Club.

In 2016, the National Museum of Visual Arts organized an anthological exhibition of her work, curated by María Eugenia Grau.

Awards
 First Prize for Engraving, National Salon of Fine Arts, Uruguay, 1966
 First Prize, Salon of the Montevideo Engraving Club, 1966
 2nd Prize, Concurso Almanaque FUNSA, Uruguay, 1969
 Salon of Illustrated Poems Award, Montevideo, 1969
 National Graphic Arts Competition Award, Montevideo, 1974, 1975, 1976, 1977
 Honorable Mention, 5th National Graphic Arts Competition, 1978
 5th Prize for Drawing, BROU Salon, Montevideo, 1980
 Award for Engraving, Salon of San José, Uruguay, 1980
 AFE Award, Salon of San José, Uruguay, 1981
 Award for Engraving, Biennial of Salto, Uruguay, 1981
 Biennial Award for Hispanoamerican Engraving, MAC, Montevideo, 1983
 Honorable Mention, BID, Punta del Este, Uruguay, 1985
 4th Prize, BROU Painting Salon, Montevideo, 1984
 First Prize (6 equal) Almanaque INCA, Montevideo, 1986
 Honorable Mention, Municipal Salon, Montevideo, 1986
 Award, Fray Bentos Drawing and Engraving Salon, Uruguay, 1986
 Award for Engraving, 2nd Plastic Arts Salon of Soriano, Uruguay, 1988
 Acquisition Award, Mini-Print of Cadaqués, Spain, 1989
 2nd Prize, BROU Engraving and Watercolor Salon, Montevideo, 1989
 Miró Award, for yearlong artistic work, Maldonado, Uruguay, 1991
 Mention, BROU Plastic Arts Salon, Montevideo, 1998
 Morosoli Award for Engraving, Minas, Uruguay, 2000
 Diploma of Honor: "Ateneo del Grabado" Award, 2004
 Second Prize "Mosto & Rojas" Digital Art International, Argentina, 2005
 Figari Award in recognition of her career, 2008
Honoree at the 60th National Prize for Visual Arts, which will take place at the Contemporary Art Space (EAC) in December 2022.

Poetic work
 Casa de las Américas Prize Mention, Havana, Cuba, 1968
 2nd Poetry Prize, Casa del Poeta Latinoamericano, Montevideo, 1979
 First Prize, Unpublished Poetry, Club Banco de Seguros, for the book El perejil y sus adyacencias, 1983
 First Prize, International Biennial of Short Poetry, Valparaíso, Chile, 1983
 Special Mention, unpublished book of poetry, No espero respuesta, Casa de Cultura del PCU, Montevideo, 1987
 Mention, Annual Municipal Art Competition of Montevideo, for published book of poetry No espero respuesta, 1989
 First Prize, published book of poetry No espero respuesta, Ministry of Education and Culture, 1989
 First Prize, unpublished book of poetry En la casa de la espera, Ministry of Education and Culture, 1995
 Mention, published book of poetry En la casa de la Espera, Ministry of Education and Culture, 1998

Published books
 Signos vitales (Collection of Today's Poets), Ed. Géminis, 1978
 No Espero Respuesta, Ed. Signos, 1989
 En la casa de la espera, 1997
 Por los siglos de los siglos, Ed. Graffiti, 1995

References

1925 births
Living people
20th-century engravers
20th-century Uruguayan painters
20th-century Uruguayan poets
20th-century Uruguayan sculptors
21st-century engravers
21st-century Uruguayan poets
Digital artists
Women digital artists
Uruguayan people of Italian descent
Uruguayan people of Jewish descent
Uruguayan violinists
Uruguayan women painters
Uruguayan women poets
Uruguayan women sculptors
Women engravers
Women violinists
Writers from Montevideo
20th-century Uruguayan women artists
21st-century Uruguayan women artists
21st-century Uruguayan women writers
20th-century Uruguayan women writers
21st-century violinists
21st-century women musicians